Yasna is a Maldivian family drama web series directed by Aminath Rinaza and Ali Rasheed. It stars Ali Azim, Aishath Lahfa, Ali Shameel and Mariyam Haleem in main roles. The pilot episode of the series was released on 12 August 2022. The fifteen episodes' series narrates the story of two past lovers whose reunion is challenged by other commitments.

Cast and characters

Main
 Ali Azim as Fauzaan
 Aishath Lahfa as Yasna
 Ali Shameel as Shareef
 Mariyam Haleem as Shameena
 Fathimath Latheefa as Waheedha
 Aminath Shaana as Anaa
 Ali Yooshau as Anil

Recurring
 Aishath Shifana as Nadha; Anaa's friend
 Fathimath Fainaa as Mufeedha; Waheedha's friend

Guest
 Moosa Ishaan as Shaan (Episode 2)
 Hawwa Shadhiya as Shaany; Fauzaan's friend (Episode 4)

Episodes

Development
The project was announced on 7 July 2022, as the first web series produced by Blue Wave Entertainment. Producer and co-director Ali Rasheed reported that ninety percent of filming was completed by June and post production work was carried out simultaneously for the initial episodes. The lead actors of the series were announced to be Ali Azim and Aishath Lahfa, while actors Ali Shameel, Mariyam Haleem, Ali Yooshau, Fathimath Latheefa and Aminath Shaana were reported to appear in supporting roles. On 24 July 2022, Rasheed shared that the post production of the series is ongoing, while eighty percent of editing is already completed. He further announced that the series will be released with English subtitles.

Soundtrack

Release and reception
The first episode of the series was made available for streaming through digital streaming platform Medianet Multi Screen on 12 August 2022. Reviewing the first five episodes of the series, Ahmed Rasheed from MuniAvas generally favored the series and praised the tense built-up as the series progress. However, other critics found the screenplay to be slow and dragging while the actors tried to give their best in an otherwise over the top melodrama.

References

Serial drama television series
Maldivian television shows
Maldivian web series